Dubh Essa Bean Uí Dubhda, Queen of Ui Fiachrach Muaidhe, died 1190.

Biography

The Annals of Loch Ce mention her death in 1190:

 Duibhessa, daughter of Diarmaid, son of Tadhg, wife of the Cosnamhach O'Dubhda, mortua est.

Her husband, An Cosnmhaidh Ua Dubhda, was assassinated in 1162.

See also

 Dubh Essa
 Kings of Ui Fiachrach Muaidhe
 O'Dowd

External links
 http://medievalscotland.org/kmo/AnnalsIndex/Feminine/DubEssa.shtml
 http://www.ucc.ie/celt/published/T100010A/index.html

1190 deaths
12th-century Irish people
12th-century Irish women
Irish royal consorts
Medieval Gaels from Ireland
Monarchs from County Mayo
Year of birth unknown